John Evans (born 1955) is an Irish former Gaelic footballer who played as a left corner-back for the Cork senior team.

Evans joined the team during the 1980 championship and was a regular member of the starting fifteen until his retirement after the 1987 championship. During that time he won one Munster medal, one National League medal and one All-Star award. Evans was an All-Ireland runner-up on one occasions.

At club level Evans is a one-time All-Ireland medalist with O'Donovan Rossa. In addition to this he has also won one Munster medal and one county club championship medal.

John also won an Allstar award in 1983

References

1955 births
Living people
Cork inter-county Gaelic footballers
Munster inter-provincial Gaelic footballers
O'Donovan Rossa (Cork) Gaelic footballers